Bid Sukhteh or Bidsukhteh or Bid-e Sukhteh may refer to:
 Bid Sukhteh, Fars
 Bidsukhteh, Kerman
 Bid Sukhteh, Razavi Khorasan